Alatenghua (Chinese 阿拉腾花, Ala Tenghua, Tenghua Ala; born on 22 January 1993)  is a Chinese draughts player (International draughts). She was Women's Asian Champion 2014 Alatenghua is an international female master (MIF).

World Championship
 2013 (6th place)
 2015 (12th place)

Asian Championship
 2014 (1st place)
 2016 (6th place)

Chinese Championship
 2009 (1st place)
 2011 (1st place)
 2013 (2nd place)
 2014 (4th place)
 2015 (1st place)
 2016 (3rd place)
 2017 (3rd place)
 2018 (2nd place)

References

External links
 Profile at toernooibase
 Profile at the FMJD website
 Participation page of the 1st SportAccord World Mind Games/Beijing 2011

1993 births
Living people
Chinese draughts players
Players of international draughts
Place of birth missing (living people)